Lazuardia is a monotypic genus of cup fungi in the family Pyronemataceae. The type species, Lazuardia lobata, grows on the ground in Ceylon, India, Java, Sumatra, Cuba, Jamaica and Trinidad.

References

Fungi of Asia
Monotypic Ascomycota genera
Pyronemataceae